Michael Buchman Silver (born July 8, 1967) is an American actor. He is perhaps best known for his recurring role as Assistant District Attorney Leo Cohen in the television series NYPD Blue. As of summer 2019, Silver has recurring roles on both NBC's The InBetween and CBS' Instinct.

Early life 
Silver was born in New York City, the brother of writer Amanda Silver and the grandson of Oscar-winning screenwriter Sidney Buchman. Silver is a graduate of Brown University.

Career 
One of his earliest roles was in the 1993 film Jason Goes to Hell: The Final Friday. He had a major recurring stint on NYPD Blue, perhaps his best-known role, appearing in 31 episodes. Silver has also had recurring roles as Dr. Paul Myers on ER and as Secret Service Agent Peter Elliott on CSI: Miami. In addition, Silver has made many other guest appearances on various primetime series such as Star Trek: Deep Space Nine, The X-Files, Cheers, NewsRadio, Judging Amy, Once and Again, Felicity, Law & Order, Monk, Dark Blue, Bones, Vengeance Unlimited, Criminal Minds, Raising the Bar, Strong Medicine, Nip/Tuck, Veronica Mars, Brothers & Sisters, Murder in the First, and Supernatural. He had a recurring role on Royal Pains as Ken Keller, and in 2011 he starred in the video game L.A. Noire as Edgar Kalou.

Beginning in the summer of 2018 and then in its second season in the summer of 2019, Michael had the recurring role of police sergeant Kanter Harris in the police procedural Instinct. In the summer of 2019, he was also appearing in the recurring role of professional therapist Brian Currie in the series The InBetween. In October of 2021, he played Vince Jones (S5/E4 - "Sentinel") in the series S.W.A.T. (2017 TV series).

Personal life 
He was married to actress Katie Mitchell on October 22, 2000 but they are now divorced. He has one son.

References

External links
 

1967 births
Living people
American male film actors
American male television actors
Jewish American male actors
Brown University alumni
Male actors from New York City
21st-century American Jews